The discography of Common, an American rapper, consists of fourteen studio albums, one collaborative album, one extended play, two compilation albums, forty-nine singles (including fifteen as a featured artist) and twenty-one music videos. It also contains the list of Common songs. Common sold more than 2.8 million albums in the United States. Common released his first album, Can I Borrow a Dollar? (1992), and follow suit with his second album, Resurrection, which met with critical acclaim, calling the album as one of the classic of the 90s. Common released his third album, One Day It'll All Make Sense, which was a little commercial success, follow suit with his fourth album, Like Water for Chocolate, which was met with critical acclaim from music critics, calling it the best rap album of the year. The album was also a commercial success certifying it gold by the Recording Industry Association of America (RIAA). His fifth studio album Electric Circus was met with acclaim from music critics. However, it failed to meet the commercial success with Like Water for Chocolate, which only peaked at number 47 on the US Billboard 200.

In 2005, he was helped by Kanye West to release his 6th album Be. West produced the whole album and was featured on it a few times. The album helped Common to get back into the spotlight and sold 185,000 copies in its first week debuting at number 2 on the charts and also it was Common's first album to have commercial success outside the US, peaking in several territories. The album was met with universal acclaim and it was described to be Common's best album. The album was certified gold by the RIAA. His next album Finding Forever peaked at number one on the Billboard 200 being his first chart-topper. His next album Universal Mind Control sold 81,663 in its first week debuting only at number 12. The album was promoted by the successful single "Universal Mind Control" which peaked at number 62 on the Billboard Hot 100. The album was met with mixed reviews. His next album The Dreamer/The Believer was met with positive reviews from music critics and debuted at number 18 on the charts, selling 70,000 copies in its first week and was promoted by five singles. In 2014 Common released his 10th album Nobody's Smiling which peaked at number 6 on the charts and had features from Big Sean and Vince Staples and others. In 2015 he collaborated with John Legend on the single "Glory" which peaked at number 49 on the Billboard Hot 100. The single was from the film Selma.

Studio albums

Collaborative albums

Compilation albums

EPs

Singles

As lead artist

As featured artist

Other charted songs

Guest appearances

Videography

Music videos

Notes 

A  "Breaker 1/9" did not enter the Hot R&B/Hip-Hop Songs chart, but peaked at number 7 on the Bubbling Under Hot R&B/Hip-Hop Singles chart, which acts as a 25-song extension to the Hot R&B/Hip-Hop Songs chart.
B  "Soul by the Pound" did not enter the Hot R&B/Hip-Hop Songs chart, but peaked at number 8 on the Bubbling Under Hot R&B/Hip-Hop Singles chart, which acts as a 25-song extension to the Hot R&B/Hip-Hop Songs chart.
C  "Resurrection" did not enter the Billboard Hot 100, but peaked at number 2 on the Bubbling Under Hot 100 Singles chart, which acts as a 25-song extension to the Hot 100.
D  "Reminding Me (Of Sef)" did not enter the Billboard Hot 100, but peaked at number 1 on the Bubbling Under Hot 100 Singles chart, which acts as a 25-song extension to the Hot 100.
E  "One-Nine-Nine-Nine" did not enter the Billboard Hot 100, but peaked at number 10 on the Bubbling Under Hot 100 Singles chart, which acts as a 25-song extension to the Hot 100.
F  "The 6th Sense" and "The Light" charted as a double A-side single in the United Kingdom.
G  Two single versions of "Come Close" were released: the first features Mary. J Blige, and the second features Erykah Badu, Pharrell and Q-Tip.
H  "The Corner" did not enter the Billboard Hot 100, but peaked at number 10 on the Bubbling Under Hot 100 Singles chart, which acts as a 25-song extension to the Hot 100.
I  "Testify" did not enter the Billboard Hot 100, but peaked at number 9 on the Bubbling Under Hot 100 Singles chart, which acts as a 25-song extension to the Hot 100.
J  "A Dream" did not enter the Hot R&B/Hip-Hop Songs chart, but peaked at number 16 on the Bubbling Under Hot R&B/Hip-Hop Singles chart, which acts as a 25-song extension to the Hot R&B/Hip-Hop Songs chart.
K  "The People" did not enter the Billboard Hot 100, but peaked at number 11 on the Bubbling Under Hot 100 Singles chart, which acts as a 25-song extension to the Hot 100.
L  "I Want You" did not enter the Billboard Hot 100, but peaked at number 12 on the Bubbling Under Hot 100 Singles chart, which acts as a 25-song extension to the Hot 100.
M  "The Bizness" did not enter the Billboard Hot 100, but peaked at number 1 on the Bubbling Under Hot 100 Singles chart, which acts as a 25-song extension to the Hot 100.
N  "In the Sun" did not enter the Hot R&B/Hip-Hop Songs chart, but peaked at number 9 on the Bubbling Under Hot R&B/Hip-Hop Singles chart, which acts as a 25-song extension to the Hot R&B/Hip-Hop Songs chart.
O  "The Light" (Remix) did not enter the Hot R&B/Hip-Hop Songs chart, but peaked at number 17 on the Bubbling Under Hot R&B/Hip-Hop Singles chart, which acts as a 25-song extension to the Hot R&B/Hip-Hop Songs chart.
P  "Decision" did not enter the Hot R&B/Hip-Hop Songs chart, but peaked at number 10 on the Bubbling Under Hot R&B/Hip-Hop Singles chart, which acts as a 25-song extension to the Hot R&B/Hip-Hop Songs chart.
Q  "The Morning" did not enter the Billboard Hot 100, but peaked at number 19 on the Bubbling Under Hot 100 Singles chart, which acts as a 25-song extension to the Hot 100.

References

Hip hop discographies
Discographies of American artists
Discography